Corruption in the Democratic Republic of the Congo, which used to be an institutionalized part of the state, has been relatively lowered in recent years. However, it continues to exceed corruption in comparison to most states. The BBC's DRC country profile calls its recent history "one of civil war and corruption." President Joseph Kabila established the Commission of Repression of Economic Crimes upon his ascension to power in 2001.

History

The Mobutu era (1965–1997) 

Mobutu Sese Seko ruled Zaire from 1965 to 1997, looting his country's wealth for personal use to such a degree that critics coined the term "kleptocracy". A relative once explained how the government illicitly collected revenue: "Mobutu would ask one of us to go to the bank and take out a million. We'd go to an intermediary and tell him to get five million. He would go to the bank with Mobutu's authority, and take out ten. Mobutu got one, and we took the other nine."
The Congolese explained the lack of support from the government by the humorous article 15: Débrouillez-vous ("Figure it yourself").

Mobutu institutionalized corruption to prevent political rivals from challenging his control, leading to an economic collapse in 1996. Mobutu allegedly stole up to US$4 billion while in office.

The Kabila Era (1997–2019) 
Laurent Kabila led an insurgent group against Mobutu and quickly assumed power after Mobutu was overthrown. During this time period, Kabila issued a statement making himself president with near absolute power in the government. With people supporting him for overthrowing Mobutu, he was not initially met with much public opposition. However, Kabila's and his government's goals for the regime were said to be unclear and vague.

He refused immediate elections in fear of the country returning to Mobutuism, and continued to postpone promised elections. The constitution was not changed, and he and his peers exploited resources for their personal benefit. Laurent Kabila, led a regime that upheld corruption through clientelism by appointing his clients as cabinet members. Under the Kabila regime, the DRC has failed to pull itself out of its “collapsed state” status from when Mobutu was in power.

The government has not implemented security and human rights reforms, free media, and the decentralization of power. The economy plummeted, forcing workers to be underpaid and living conditions to deteriorate. Laurent Kabila was killed in 2001 by one of his body guards in an attempted coup d'état.

During that time period, The Democratic Republic of Congo received a score of 1.9 out of 10 in the Corruption Perception Index, which reveals high levels of corruption.

His son, Joseph Kabila was elected president after Laurent Kabila's death. Joseph Kabila is working with the World Bank to curtail corruption and improve economy. In addition, the Commission of Economic Crimes was implemented in 2001 by President Joseph Kabila. Nonetheless, there are still reports of high ranking officials exploiting resources for their personal benefit and other forms of corruption. In 2006, the constitution changed the president's minimum age from 35 to 30 years old to include Joseph Kabila, who was 33 at the time.

In 2017, Reuters exposed a scheme involving overpriced biometric passports.

After Kabilas (2019–) 

In June 2020, a court in the Democratic Republic of Congo found President Felix Tshisekedi's chief of staff  Vital Kamerhe guilty of corruption. He was sentenced to 20 years'  hard labor, after facing charges of embezzling almost $50m (£39m) of public funds. He was the most high-profile figure to be convicted of corruption in the DRC. However, Kamerhe was released already in December 2021.

In November 2021, a judicial investigation targeting former president Joseph Kabila and his associates was opened in Kinshasa after revelations of alleged embezzlement of $138 million.

Corruption Perceptions Index

The table above shows how the Democratic Republic of the Congo fared in six successive years of Transparency International's ranking of 180 countries in the Corruption Perceptions Index. Countries are scored on a scale from 0 ("highly corrupt") to 100 ("highly clean") and then ranked by score; the country ranked first is perceived to have the most honest public sector and the country ranked 180th is perceived to have the most corrupt public sector.

See also
Resource Extraction in the Democratic Republic of Congo
Democratic Republic of the Congo passport
Corruption in Angola

General:
Crime in the Democratic Republic of the Congo
Kleptocracy
International Anti-Corruption Academy
Group of States Against Corruption
International Anti-Corruption Day
ISO 37001 Anti-bribery management systems
United Nations Convention against Corruption
OECD Anti-Bribery Convention
Transparency International

References

External links
 Interactive world map of the Corruption Perception Index

Democratic Republic of the Congo
Democratic Republic of the Congo
Crime in the Democratic Republic of the Congo
Economy of the Democratic Republic of the Congo
Politics of the Democratic Republic of the Congo